The 2009 season saw Kent County Cricket Club competing in four competitions; the Second Division of the County Championship, the Friends Provident Trophy, the second division of the Pro40 League and the Twenty20 Cup. It was the county's first ever season in the second tier of the County Championship, following their relegation at the end of the 2008 season.

Promotion back to the First Division of the County Championship was achieved on 18 September following a draw against Leicestershire.

Squad
Kent originally announced that their overseas player for 2009 would be Australian fast bowler Stuart Clark. However Clark received a late call-up to join the Australian tour of South Africa forcing the county side to look at other options. Kent announced Clark's replacement would be South African 19-year old left-arm fast bowler Wayne Parnell. Three other South African players remained at the county as Kolpak players: all-rounders Justin Kemp, Ryan McLaren and vice-captain Martin van Jaarsveld. In addition, former Pakistan international all-rounder Azhar Mahmood was with Kent for a second season, having been granted British citizenship.

Batsman James Hockley, who was released at the end of the 2002 season and had been playing club cricket and teaching since, was re-signed by Kent for a second spell. Left-arm spinner Rob Ferley also returned for a second spell with the county.

With Parnell yet to arrive, McLaren on IPL duty, and several other bowlers suffering with early season injuries, Kent signed 35-year old seamer Steffan Jones on a one-month loan from Somerset at the start of the season.

Squad list
 Ages given as of the first day of the County Championship season, 15 April 2009.

Summary

First-class matches
In all, the county played seventeen first-class matches, consisting of sixteen County Championship games and a three-day friendly against Loughborough University Centre of Cricketing Excellence.

One day matches

Twenty20 Cup
Kent finished top of the South Division table, qualifying for the quarter-finals for the fourth consecutive season. Victory against Durham saw them qualify for Finals Day at Edgbaston, where they were comprehensively beaten by Somerset in the second semi final.

Matches

First-class matches

Friends Provident Trophy matches

Pro40 League matches

Twenty20 Cup matches

Tables

County Championship Division Two

Friends Provident Trophy Group B

Natwest Pro40 League Division Two

Twenty20 Cup South Group

Statistics

Batting

Bowling

References

2009 in English cricket
2009